Fishbone, Wishbone, Funnybone is an album by Massachusetts-based English folk musician Zoë Lewis, released in 2001.

Track listing 
Bastille Day
Fortune Cookie
When the Developers Came to Tea
Lullaby on 24th and Mission
Going Song
Sarcophagi
Jam
Funnybone
Jacques Cousteau
Write Me a Letter
Snail Road
Miss. Jones
Squid

2001 albums